Sambhaji Nagar Lok Sabha constituency is one of the 48 Lok Sabha (parliamentary)  constituencies in Maharashtra state in western India.

Assembly Segments
Presently, Aurangabad Lok Sabha constituency comprises six Vidhan Sabha (legislative assembly) segments. These segments are:

Members of Parliament

Election results

General Elections 2019

General Elections 2014

General Elections 2009

Notes

External links

Lok Sabha constituencies in Maharashtra
Aurangabad district, Maharashtra
1952 establishments in Bombay State
Constituencies established in 1952